The 1996–97 All-Ireland Senior Club Football Championship was the 27th staging of the All-Ireland Senior Club Football Championship since its establishment by the Gaelic Athletic Association in 1970-71. The championship began on 6 October 1996  and ended on 17 March 1997.

Laune Rangers entered the championship as the defending champions, however, they were beaten by Crossmaglen Rangers in the All-Ireland semi-final.

On 17 March 1997, Crossmaglen Rangers won the championship following a 2-13 to 0-11 defeat of Knockmore in the All-Ireland final at Croke Park. It was their first ever championship title.

Crossmaglen Rangers's Oisín McConville was the championship's top scorer with 2-30.

Results

Connacht Senior Club Football Championship

Quarter-final

Semi-finals

Final

Leinster Senior Club Football Championship

First round

Quarter-finals

Semi-finals

Final

Munster Senior Club Football Championship

First round

Semi-finals

Final

Ulster Senior Club Football Championship

Preliminary round

Quarter-finals

Semi-finals

Final

All-Ireland Senior Club Football Championship

Quarter-final

Semi-finals

Final

Championship statistics

Top scorers

Overall

In a single game

References

1996 in Gaelic football
1997 in Gaelic football